Hinderton Hall is a 4-6-0 GWR 4900 Class locomotive preserved at Didcot Railway Centre. It was designed by Collett in 1928, built at Swindon in 1931 as the 101st of its class.

The locomotive spent most of its working life in the West Country. It was withdrawn from Bristol in 1963 and sent to Woodham Brothers scrapyard in Barry, South Wales. It was rescued by members of the Great Western Society and sent to Didcot Railway Centre in 1971. It saw considerable main line service (including being involved in the GWR 150 celebrations in 1985), as well as in the centre. As of April 2019 it is on static display and is waiting for an overhaul.

References

5900
Railway locomotives introduced in 1931
5900
Locomotives saved from Woodham Brothers scrapyard
Standard gauge steam locomotives of Great Britain
4-6-0 locomotives